Hazem Jassam (born 1 July 1949) is an Iraqi professional football player and manager who played for Iraq in the 1972 AFC Asian Cup.

Career
In 1970s he played for the Iraq national football team. He was a former captain of Al-Zawra'a SC in the Seventies. He played on position in centre midfield also played on the right wing.

In 1994, he coached Qatar SC. He coached the Yemen national football team for a brief period in 1997. He had a second spell as coach the same year, this time managing the team until 1999. From 2002 to 2003 he again worked as a head coach of Yemen team.

In the 2009–2010 season he led Al-Zawraa.

Career statistics

International goals
Scores and results list Iraq's goal tally first.

References

Living people
Iraqi footballers
Iraq international footballers
Iraqi football managers
Yemen national football team managers
Place of birth missing (living people)
Association footballers not categorized by position
1949 births
1972 AFC Asian Cup players
Footballers at the 1974 Asian Games
Al-Zawraa SC managers
Asian Games competitors for Iraq
Iraqi expatriate football managers
Expatriate football managers in Qatar
Iraqi expatriate sportspeople in Yemen
Iraqi expatriate sportspeople in Qatar
Expatriate football managers in Yemen
Qatar SC managers